CD-Cops is the first CD-ROM protection that uses the geometry of the CD-ROM media rather than a hidden "mark". It was invented in 1996 by Danish Link Data Security, known for its Cops Copylock key-diskette security used in the 1990s by Lotus 1-2-3.

Overview

As a copy (CD-R or CD-ROM) will have a different geometry, Data Position Measurement needs to be used for copies. The geometry is not known before CDs have been produced, therefore a CD-code expressing the layout of the CD-ROM must be entered the first time a user runs the protected software. Using a special production process in some cases the CD-code is embedded on the CD-ROM. CD-Cops is popular for encyclopaedias/dictionaries and business applications but not used as much for games.

DVD-Cops based on the same principles in 1998 was the first DVD-ROM protection made.

References

Sources
Analysis
Report
cdmediaworld
PDF
article

External links
CD-Cops at linkdata.com
DVD-Cops at linkdata.com

Compact Disc and DVD copy protection
Digital rights management for macOS